Black Island, also known as Malajon Island, is one of the many islands that belong to the Calamian Islands group in Palawan, Philippines. It is part of the municipality of Busuanga in the Province of Palawan. The island is a tourist spot that features caves and various shipwrecks.

Transportation
To get to the island, one has to ride by boat from any point in the main island of Busuanga.

References

See also

 List of islands of the Philippines

Calamian Islands